Taw Valley Halt railway station is the current (and temporary) southern terminus of the Swindon and Cricklade Railway, a heritage railway line in Wiltshire, South-West England. The restored line was extended to the site of the halt in 2012, and the halt was opened in 2014.
The halt is at the point where the new track diverges from the original route of the Midland and South Western Junction Railway. There is a short siding on the original trackbed.

The halt is close to Mouldon Hill Country Park on the northwest outskirts of Swindon.

References

Heritage railway stations in Wiltshire
Railway stations built for UK heritage railways
Railway stations in Great Britain opened in 2014